Schela may refer to several places in Romania:

 Schela, Gorj, a commune in Gorj County
 Schela, Galați, a commune in Galați County
 Schela, a village in Glodeni Commune, Dâmbovița County
 Schela, a district in the town of Băicoi, Prahova County
 Deparați, a village in Trivalea-Moșteni Commune, Teleorman County, called Schela until 2001